Theodote ("divine gift") is the feminine form of Theodotus and may refer to:

Saint Theodota of Philippi (died 318), Greek harlot and martyr.
 Theodote, the second empress consort of Constantine VI of the Byzantine Empire
 Theodota, who had a sexual relationship with the Lombard king Cunipert
 Theodote (courtesan), an Athenian courtesan in ancient Greece
 Acraea theodote, a synonym of the butterfly Acraea andromacha